Northside Christian School is a private Christian school in North Charleston, South Carolina, United States. It is a ministry of Northside Baptist Church and was founded in 1975 by Dr. Garth Sibert.  Northside has more than 300 students in grades K3-12. There is also a Toddler 1-2 program. There are 786 alumni serving in ministry, the military, education, and in professions such as dentistry, medicine, law, and engineering.

Northside is accredited by the South Carolina Association of Christian Schools and is a long-time member of the Tri-County Admissions Council, an association of independent schools in the tri-county area.

The school colors are royal blue and gold, its mascot is a bald eagle. "Northside Eagle" is displayed on athletic and school uniforms.

External links 
 SCACS.
 Tri-County Admissions Council.

Christian schools in South Carolina
Private high schools in South Carolina
Schools in Charleston County, South Carolina
Private middle schools in South Carolina
Private elementary schools in South Carolina
1975 establishments in South Carolina
Educational institutions established in 1975